Morgan's Point Resort is a General Law city in Bell County, Texas, United States.Morgan's Point Resort was incorporated 1970. Per 2020 census the population was 4,636. It is part of the Killeen–Temple–Fort Hood Metropolitan Statistical Area.

Geography

Morgan's Point Resort is located north of the center of Bell County at  (31.156543, –97.454580), on the east side of Belton Lake, a reservoir of the Leon River. It is bordered to the south by the city of Temple.

Morgan's Point Resort adjoins Belton Lake.

Demographics

As of the 2020 United States census, there were 4,636 people, 1,644 households, and 1,206 families residing in the city.

As of the census of 2000, the city had 2,989 inhabitants consisting of 1,114 households and 894 families. The population density was 1,169.7 people per square mile (450.8/km. The city had 1,194 housing units with an average density of 467.3/sq mi (180.1/km). Racial makeup of the city was 91.03% White, 0.43% African American, 0.43% Native American, 0.60% Asian, 0.17% Pacific Islander, 5.82% from other races, and 1.51% from two or more races. Hispanic or Latino of any race were 9.27% of the population.

Of 1,114 households 40.7% had children under the age of 18 living with them, 65.9% were married couples living together; 10.3% had a female householder with no husband present, and 19.7% were non-families. 16.2% of all households consisted of individuals, 5.6% had someone 65 years or older living alone. Average household size was 2.68, and average family size was 3.00.

Population spread was: 28.6% under the age of 18, 6.2% age 18 to 24, 31.6% age 25 to 44, 24.4% age 45 to 64, and 9.3% age 65 years or older. Median age was 36 years. For every 100 females were 95.4 males. For every 100 females age 18 and over were 94.1 males.

Median income for a household was $51,921, median income for a family was $55,069. Median income for males was $37,095, for females $25,83.  Per capita income was $21,522. About 4.3% of families and 6.1% of the population were below the poverty line,including 9.1% of those under age 18 and 3.6% of those age 65 or over.

Education
Morgan's Point Resort is served by the Belton Independent School District.

References

External links
City of Morgan's Point Resort official website

Cities in Bell County, Texas
Cities in Texas
Killeen–Temple–Fort Hood metropolitan area
Populated places established in 1970
1970 establishments in Texas